Aes grave (heavy bronze) is a term in numismatics indicating bronze cast coins used in central Italy during the 3rd century BC, whose value was generally indicated by signs: I for the as, S for semis and pellets for unciae. Standard weights for the as were 272, 327, or 341 grams, depending upon the issuing authority.

The main Roman cast coins had these marks and images:



Issuing cities 

Main series were from Rome, Ariminum (Rimini), Iguvium (Gubbio), Tuder (Todi), Ausculum (Ascoli Satriano), Firmum (Fermo), Hatria - Hadria (Atri), Luceria (Lucera), and Latin central Italy. Other series have unknown provenance.

Gallery

See also

 Roman Republican coinage
 Aes rude
 Aes signatum

References

Further reading 
 Haeberlin, Ernst: Aes Grave, Das Schwergeld Roms und Mittelitaliens einschließlich der ihm vorausgehenden Rohbronzewährung, Halle 1910.
 Head, Barclay V.: Historia Nummorum, a Manual of Greek Numismatic, London, 19112.
 Sear, David: "Roman Coins and Their Values," Volume I, Spink.
 Sydenham, Edward A.: Aes Grave A Study of the Cast Coinages of Rome and Central Italy. London, Spink, 1926.
 Italo Vecchi. Italian Cast Coinage. A descriptive catalogue of the cast coinage of Rome and Italy. London Ancient Coins, London 2013. Hard bound in quarto format, 84 pages, 90 plates.

External links 

 Digital Historia Nummorum
 Cast Greek & Roman Coins
 The Aes Grave of Central Italy by J. G. Milne

Coins of ancient Rome
Economic history of Italy